Copelatus tschaga is a species of diving beetle. It is part of the genus Copelatus in the subfamily Copelatinae of the family Dytiscidae. It was described by Bilardo & Pederzani in 1972.

References

tschaga
Beetles described in 1972